RLJE International Ltd, d/b/a Acorn DVD, a British company that publishes and distributes DVDs, as well as selling home-video products and streaming videos with a particular focus on British television.

History 
Launched in 1997, Acorn Media U.K. Limited distributes collectible home video products in the U.K. market. By design, Acorn U.K.'s product line often overlaps with the Acorn Media U.S. line. This division of the company also serves as a permanent presence in the U.K. television programming community, a primary source of both Acorn Media U.S. and Acorn U.K. acquisitions.

Important programming franchises for this Acorn division include New Tricks, Criminal Justice, Midsomer Murders, Foyle's War, Trial & Retribution, Wild at Heart, Wainwright Walks, and Inspector George Gently.

In April 2007, Acorn Media U.K. launched Acacia U.K., a healthy joyful living brand encompassing licensed and original programming on DVD.

In 2012, RLJ Companies bought Acorn Media, including a majority share in Agatha Christie Ltd, and Image to form RLJ Entertainment.

Titles 
The company publishes television titles (in either individual or box-set formats) including:

Situation comedies 

 Barking
 Chelmsford 123
 Filthy Rich & Catflap 25th Anniversary Edition
 First of the Summer Wine
 Oh, Doctor Beeching!
 Rude Tube
 The Good Life
 The Liver Birds
 To the Manor Born

Dramas

 Above Suspicion
 Agatha Christie's Partners in Crime
 All Creatures Great and Small (2020 TV series)
 Ashes to Ashes
 Bad Girls
 Broadchurch
 Criminal Justice
 Doc Martin
 Down to Earth
 Father Dowling Mysteries 
 Footballers' Wives
 Foyle's War
 Garrow's Law
 Inspector George Gently
 The Inspector Lynley Mysteries
 Jane Eyre
 Kingdom
 Life on Mars
 Line of Duty
 Midsomer Murders
 Murderland
 New Tricks
 Queer as Folk
 Taggart
 The Fall
 The Smoke
 The Tunnel
 Trial & Retribution
 Waterloo Road
 When the Boat Comes In
 Wild at Heart

Classic dramas 

 Sutherland's Law
 Tenko

Period dramas 

 A Family at War
 Dixon of Dock Green
 Clochemerle
 I, Claudius (US only)
 Ivanhoe
 Lilies
 Lord Peter Wimsey
 Miss Fisher's Murder Mysteries
 Penmerric
 Rhodes
 The Bletchley Circle
 The House of Eliott
 The Strauss Family
 The Crimson Field
 The Edwardians
 Z-Cars

Special interest 

 Antiques Roadshow (UK edition)
 Apollo 11 anniversary DVD
 Britain's Best Drives
 Coal House
 Countryfile
 Extreme Fishing with Robson Green
 Edwardian Farm
 Fred Dibnah's Steam Collection, Railway Collection
 Wainwright Walks with Julia Bradbury
 Wainwright Walks: Coast to Coast with Julia Bradbury
 Railway Walks with Julia Bradbury
 Oz and Huw Raise the Bar
 Oz and James's Big Wine Adventure
 Victorian Farm
 Who Do You Think You Are? (UK edition)

See also 

 Acorn TV

References

External links 
 , the company's official UK website
 , the company's US website

1997 establishments in England
British companies established in 1997
Distribution companies of the United Kingdom
DVD companies of the United Kingdom
Video on demand services
Entertainment companies of the United Kingdom
Mail-order retailers
Media and communications in the London Borough of Lambeth
Online retailers of the United Kingdom
Privately held companies based in London
Publishing companies based in London
Publishing companies established in 1997
Retail companies based in London
Retail companies established in 1997
Television companies of the United Kingdom